Curman is a surname, likely of Swedish origin. Notable people with the surname include:

Calla Curman (1850-1935), Swedish writer, salon-holder, and feminist
Carl Curman (1833-1913), Swedish physician and balneologist
Maria Curman (born 1950), Swedish businesswoman